Gars Abbey is a monastery on the Inn River in Bavaria, Germany, in the town of Gars am Inn.
It was founded in 768 and has been occupied by Benedictine monks, Augustinian Canons Regular, and most recently Redemptorists.

History

The monastery was founded in 768 by the cleric Boso from Salzburg for Tassilo III, Duke of Bavaria.
It was dedicated to saints Mary and Radegund and at first was under the Benedictine rule.
The monastery was originally called "Cella Garoz". For centuries it belonged to the archbishopric of Salzburg.
In 1128 Bishop Conrad I of Salzburg transferred the monastery to the Augustinian Canons.
They erected the present monastery building after 1122.
Archbishop Eberhard II of Salzburg (1200–46) took over the advocacies of the Au and Gars Augustinian collegiate churches from their secular lords, the Mödlings.

The monastery is interesting for the relics of the martyr Felix.
Ceiling paintings and an altar show the importance of this saint to the monastery.
The painted cast stone Pieta on a side altar dates from 1430, and was formerly the main altar of the church.
The monastery was home to scholars who valued old alphabets.
A late 16th century book from the monastery has a marginal gloss in perfectly correct runic writing.

In 1648 the Swedes pillaged and devastated the town and the monastery.
Under Provost Athanasius Peitlhauser the monastery was rebuilt between 1657 and 1659.
The monastery wings and the Church of the Assumption were renovated by Italian artists to their present form.
The pilaster church was rebuilt after 1661, one of the first Baroque churches in the region.
The work was done under the direction of Christoph Zuccalli(de) and his two cousins Kaspar(de) and Enrico(de) from Roveredo in the Swiss Canton of Grisons.
The Zuccalli brothers, who made frescos at Weyarn, Gars and Au, were among the small number of foreigners who could get significant commissions.

Post-secularization
In 1803 the Augustinian Canons were expelled as part of the Bavarian secularization program.
The buildings and inventory were sold to private individuals.
In 1855 the Redemptorists showed an interest in Gars Monastery, and in 1858 they formally re-opened the monastery.
Between 1873 and 1894 under the Kulturkampf only three fathers and brothers were allowed to remain.
After the monastery was restored in 1894 the first missionaries were sent to Brazil.
From 1907 to 1973, Gars housed a Philosophical-Theological College for the Redemptorists.

Today

As of 2013 the monastery housed about 16 brothers and 13 priests. 
The brothers follow various professions including work as bakers, butchers, gardeners, carpenters and tailors. 
The Fathers work as ward missionaries, helping in the surrounding communities and in education.
The monastery has a plant nursery that is well known in the region.
The building complex also houses the teaching and administrative rooms of the Gymnasium Gars and an institute for teacher training.

Notable people

The stigmatist Louise Beck(de) (1822–79) of Gars had influence over her confessors concerning church policies. She was in personal contact and correspondence with Maria von Mörl(de). 
A gifted mystic, Beck had visions from her childhood, and a cult formed around her after she developed the stigmata of Christ.
Many priests and believers asked for her directions to save their souls, and gave her their life confessions.
This inevitably led to dependency and bondage, where they had to be "faithful children" of the "mother" to avoid eternal ruin.
She lived in the monastery from 1862 until her death.

After completing his training as an artist, the painter Max Schmalzl joined the Redemptorist Order at Gars Abbey as a novice in November 1871. Schmalzl died at the monastery in Gars am Inn on 7 January 1930 at the age of 79.

Kaspar Stanggassinger' entered the Redemptorist novitiate at Gars in 1892. He was ordained a priest in Regensburg in 1895 and was assigned to training future missionaries at the minor seminary of Dürrnberg, near Hallein. In 1899 he was transferred to Gars as director of the new seminary there, but died of peritonitis on 26 September 1899. His body was transferred to the side chapel of the Church of Gars in 1935, and in 1988 he was beatified.

Augustinian canons regular

The Augustinian canons regular were:

 Eppo I.
 Eberwin
 Hugo, 1129, 1158
 Heinrich I., 1160
 Friedrich I.
 Egenolf, 1170
 Heinrich II., 1171, 1177
 Johann I., 1179, 
 Berthold I., 1185, 1195
 Adelung (Adelwin), 1198, 1210
 Heinrich III., 1219
 Friedrich II., 1229
 Ulrich (?)
 Conrad I., 1288
 Thomas I., † 1307 (?)
 Jakob I.
 Gundaker, † 1317 (?)
 Seyfrid
 Hartnid, † 1323 (?)
 Berthold
 Stephan
 Thomas II.
 Jakob II.
 Zacharias, 1381
 Albert von Leuzendorf, 1383
 Jakob III., 1388
 Jakob IV. Hinterkircher, 1414–1420
 Conrad II. Dezlsamer, † 1435
 Thomas III. Surauer, 1435–1455
 Christian Nadler, 1455–1459
 Johann II. Mosheimer, 1459–1469
 Johann III. Stockhaimer, 1469–1494; received pontifical vestments in 1484
 Jakob V. Zollner, 1494–1510
 Johann IV. Schambacher, 1510–1516
 Joachim, 1516
 Sebastian Peltram, 1516–1528
 Caspar von Leuzenbrunn, 1528–1533
 Valentin Rhem, 1533–1540
 Georg I. Edenhueber, 1540–1556
 Georg II. Hadersperger, 1557–1591
 Michael Wagnereck, 1592–1620
 Peter Mittmann, 1620–1643
 Ubald Mayr, 1643–1648
 Athanas Peitlhauser, 1648–1698
 Gelasius Ludwig, 1698–1742
 Paulus Hoelzl, 1742–1751
 Joseph Schmid, 1751–1771
 Floridus Fak, 1772–1794
 Augustin Hacklinger, 1794–1803, † 1830

Citations

Sources

Monasteries in Bavaria
Mühldorf (district)